Lou Richards (born September 3, 1951) is an American actor and voice actor.

Among his voice roles were Leader-1 in Challenge of the GoBots, Galtar in Galtar and the Golden Lance, and Flash Gordon in Defenders of the Earth. He is also known for playing Clark V. Uhley, Jr. in the short-lived All in the Family sitcom spin-off Gloria and Deputy Dennis Putnam in She's the Sheriff.

Filmography

References

External links

lourichards.nowcasting.com

1951 births
Living people
American male television actors
American male voice actors
American male film actors
Male actors from Texas
People from Perryton, Texas
20th-century American male actors
21st-century American male actors